Lidia Poët (26 August 1855 in  – 25 February 1949) was the first modern female Italian lawyer. Her disbarring led to a movement to allow women to practice law and hold public office in Italy.

Career
Born in 1855 in the hamlet of Traverse, Perrero comune, in the Valle Germanasca, she passed her law examinations at the University of Turin, Faculty of Law and received her degree on June 17, 1881. For the following two years, she "attended forensic practice" in the office of a lawyer and assisted at the sessions of the tribunals. She then underwent the theoretical and practical examination of the Order of Advocates of Turin and, approved by 45 of 50 votes, was inscribed in the roll of lawyers (albo degli avvocati) on August 9, 1883.

However, the inscription of a woman on the roll "did not please" the office of the attorney general (procuratore generale), who entered a complaint with the Court of Appeal of Turin. Despite rejoinders, arguments, and examples of women lawyers in other countries (such as Clara S. Foltz), the attorney general argued that women were forbidden by law and public policy to enter the milizia togata. The Court of Appeal subsequently found that the inscription of Poët was illegal. She appealed to the Supreme Court of Cassation, but the decision of the lower court was confirmed.

Debate on women and the legal profession in Italy
Public debate ensued, with 25 Italian newspapers supporting women's public roles and only three against. Those against made statements such as that the only men who supported women's public roles were themselves unmarried celibates. A teacher at the University of Padua named Taverni interviewed the American Minister to Italy William Waldorf Astor, and reported that he said, "that the public opinion of the Americans was not in favor of the exercise of professions by women, inasmuch as the female physicians, lawyers, etc., practicing in America, do not belong either to the aristocracy of money or to that of intellect." However, Taverni himself favored public lives for women, as it would save the 250,000 unmarriageable Italian women who, if society did not give them a role, would spend their lives as nihilists.

Poët worked in her brother's law office after the Corte Suprema di Cassazione precluded her admission as an advocate to the Turin bar association in 1884. Interestingly, Poët did the work of an advocate even though she could not sign letters or plead in court. When her brother departed for Vichy each year, she took over the practice entirely, and when necessary, sought out male colleagues to plead in court on behalf of her clients.

All of this aside, the central questions came down to whether a husband would incur liability for his wife's practicing advocacy and whether in the construction of the statutes, the words in the masculine gender were meant to apply to men only.  Even today, in Italian court, it is not unusual for female lawyers to be addressed as "signorina" or "signora" (Ms. or Mrs.), whereas male lawyers always are addressed as "avvocato" (lawyer).

Later life
Sources report that, for the rest of her life, Poët was active in the international women's movement.

Under Law n. 1176 of July 17, 1919, women were allowed to hold certain public offices. It wasn’t until 1920 that Lidia Poët as a 65 year old woman, was enlisted in the record of the members of the Council of lawyers and officially recognized as a lawyer, when finally inscribed in the roll of advocates in Turin.

References in popular culture 

Lidia Poët's life is stylized in the Netflix TV series The Law According to Lidia Poët and played by Matilda De Angelis.

See also 
 First women lawyers around the world

References

Sources 
 Cristina Ricci, "Lidia Poët. Vita e battaglie della prima avvocata italiana, pioniera dell'emancipazione femminile", (tr. "Lidia Poët. Life and battles of the first Italian lawyer, pioneer of female emancipation") Graphot & LAR Editori, Torino  
 Ferdinando Santoni de Sio, La Donna e l'Avvocatura, (tr. "Women and Advocacy") Rome, 1884 (2 voll.)
 Montgomery H. Throop, "Woman and the Legal Profession," Albany Law Journal (Dec. 13, 1884), 464-67
 Marino Raichich, "Liceo, università, professioni: un percorso difficile," in Simonetta Soldani, ed., L'educazione delle donne: Scuole e modelli di vita femminile nell'Italia dell'Ottocento (tr. "High school, university, professions: a difficult path," in Simonetta Soldani, ed., "The education of women: Schools and models of female life in 19th century Italy") (Milan, 1989), pp 151–53
 Clara Bounous, La toga negata. Da Lidia Poët all’attuale realtà torinese (tr. "The toga denied. From Lidia Poët to the current Turin reality") (Pinerolo 1997)
 James C. Albisetti, "Portia ante portas. Women and the Legal Profession in Europe, ca. 1870-1925," Journal of Social History (Summer, 2000) Copy online

1855 births
1949 deaths
19th-century Italian lawyers
20th-century Italian lawyers
Italian feminists
Italian women lawyers
People from Pinerolo
University of Turin alumni
20th-century women lawyers
19th-century women lawyers